In the Republic of India, according to the Article 154 of Constitution of India, a governor is the constitutional head of each of the twenty-eight states. The governor is appointed by the president of India for a term of five years, and holds office at the president's pleasure.

The governor is de jure head of the state government; all its executive actions are taken in the governor's name. However, the governor must act on the advice of the popularly elected council of ministers, headed by the chief minister, which thus holds de facto executive authority at the state-level. The Constitution of India also empowers the governor to appoint or dismiss a ministry, recommend president's rule, or reserve bills for the president's assent. Over the years, the exercise of these discretionary powers have given rise to conflict between the elected chief minister and the union government–appointed governor.

Current governors of all Indian states 
The following list consists of the list of the current governors of all the Indian states.

See also 

 List of current Indian lieutenant governors and administrators
 List of current Indian chief ministers
 List of current Indian chief justices
 List of current Indian legislative speakers and chairpersons
 List of current Indian opposition leaders
 List of female governors and lieutenant governors in India
List of presidents of India

References

G

G
Patel Ishu Verma.